Sara Pérez Sala (born 12 January 1988) is a Spanish triathlete and road cyclist, who most recently rode for UCI Women's Continental Team . Pérez also competed as a breaststroke swimmer for Spain at the 2004 Summer Olympics in Athens, Greece.

References

External links

1988 births
Living people
Spanish female breaststroke swimmers
Swimmers at the 2004 Summer Olympics
Swimmers from Barcelona
Mediterranean Games gold medalists for Spain
Mediterranean Games silver medalists for Spain
Swimmers at the 2005 Mediterranean Games
Mediterranean Games medalists in swimming
Olympic swimmers of Spain
Cyclists from Barcelona
21st-century Spanish women